Mohan is a 1947 Bollywood film directed by Anadinath Bannerjee and starring Dev Anand and Butt Kashar.

Cast
 Dev Anand
 Hemavati
 Alka Achrekar
 Vimla Vashishth

Songs

References

External links 
 

1947 films
1940s Hindi-language films
Films scored by Husnlal Bhagatram
Indian black-and-white films
Indian drama films
1947 drama films